It's About Time is the second and final album by British-American electronic music duo Tonto, previously known as Tonto's Expanding Head Band, released in 1974 by Polydor Records. The album is a showcase for TONTO (The Original New Timbral Orchestra), a multitimbral, polyphonic synthesizer built by the two members of the band, Malcolm Cecil and Robert Margouleff, as a developed version of the Moog III synth in 1969.

Track listing

Side one: Face Up
 "Beautiful You" – 5:44
 "Tonto's Travels" – 8:25
 "Nil Desperandum" – 5:50

Side two: Pyramid Suite: The Pharaoh's Journey From Death To Life
 "The Boatman" – 5:06
 "Building the Pyramid" – 3:40
 "Journey To the West" – 8:28
 "Forty-Nine Judges/Bird Flies Free" – 2:24

Personnel
Malcolm Cecil – composer, engineer, producer
Michael Cembalo – guitar
Joan Decola – mixing assistant
Steve Gadd – drums
Armand Habdurian – percussion
Marlo Henderson – guitar
Mike Hules – executive producer
Robert Margouleff – composer, engineer, producer
Reggie McBride – bass
Joan Nielsen – illustrations, layout, lettering
Tama Starr – art direction, associate producer

References

1974 albums
Tonto's Expanding Head Band albums
Science fiction albums